Roger Federer defeated Rafael Nadal in the final, 6–3, 3–6, 6–1 to win the singles tennis title at the 2010 ATP World Tour Finals. It was his fifth Tour Finals title. Nadal was attempting to complete the career Super Slam.

Nikolay Davydenko was the reigning champion, but did not qualify this year.

Seeds

Alternates

Draw

Finals

Group A
Standings are determined by: 1. number of wins; 2. number of matches; 3. in two-players-ties, head-to-head records; 4. in three-players-ties, percentage of sets won, or of games won; 5. steering-committee decision.

Group B
Standings are determined by: 1. number of wins; 2. number of matches; 3. in two-players-ties, head-to-head records; 4. in three-players-ties, percentage of sets won, or of games won; 5. steering-committee decision.

See also
ATP World Tour Finals appearances

External links
Main Draw

Singles